Mark Harry Diones (born March 1, 1993) is a triple jumper from the Philippines. In 2017 he won silver medals at the Asian Championships and Southeast Asian Games. He placed 12th at the 2018 Asian Games.

References

Filipino male triple jumpers
1993 births
Living people
Sportspeople from Camarines Sur
Athletes (track and field) at the 2018 Asian Games
Southeast Asian Games silver medalists for the Philippines
Southeast Asian Games medalists in athletics
Competitors at the 2017 Southeast Asian Games
Asian Games competitors for the Philippines
Competitors at the 2019 Southeast Asian Games